The See-Saw is an oil-on-canvas painting by French Rococo artist Jean-Honoré Fragonard, created c.1750–1752 during the artist's early career. It is currently in the Thyssen-Bornemisza Museum in Madrid. The painting forms a pair with another Fragonard work entitled Blind Man's Bluff. Blind Man's Bluff focuses on courtship while The See-Saw, and the metaphor of the rocking motion of the seesaw, suggests the relationship has been consummated. 

The See-Saw depicts young children playing with a seesaw in a forest grove. It is seen as an important precedent to Fragonard's masterpiece The Swing.

References

Further reading 
 Delphi Complete Works of Jean-Honoré Fragonard (Illustrated)
 149 Paintings You Really Need to See in Europe (So You Can Ignore the Others)

Paintings in the Thyssen-Bornemisza Museum
Paintings by Jean-Honoré Fragonard
Paintings of children
1750s paintings
Food and drink paintings